Emma Louise Willis (née Griffiths; born 18 March 1976) is an English broadcaster. She is known for her television and radio work with Channel 5, BBC, ITV, and Heart FM. Willis has presented Big Brother and Celebrity Big Brother (2013–2018), as well as the spin-off series Big Brother's Bit on the Side (2011–2015). Since 2014, she has presented The Voice UK. In 2019 and 2021, Willis presented the second and third series of The Circle.

Early life
Emma Willis was born in Sutton Coldfield, Birmingham, attending Wylde Green Primary School and then John Willmott School in Sutton Coldfield. She began modelling at the age of 15, and during her career worked for a range of magazines, retailers and companies including Marie Claire, Elle, Vogue, GAP and Chanel.

Career
Willis got her first big break presenting on MTV in 2002 before presenting various other shows, including guest-hosting shows such as CD:UK, This Morning and Loose Women.

ITV
In 2007, Willis presented ITV2 spin-off series I'm a Celebrity...Get Me Out of Here! NOW! with her husband Matt before departing in 2008. She presented numerous episodes of The Hot Desk on ITV2 between 2008 and 2014. In September 2012, Willis became a permanent presenter on This Morning, presenting segments in The Hub, taking over from Coleen Nolan. The feature was axed in 2014. She was also a stand-in presenter on the main show when Holly Willoughby or Ruth Langsford were absent and returned to guest present the show with Rylan Clark-Neal in 2018. Willis hosted two series of the ITV2 reality show Girlfriends in 2012 and 2013.

On 16 November 2012, Willis was drafted in to guest anchor Loose Women and has since presented on several occasions as a stand-in presenter. In 2013, Willis guest presented an episode of The Paul O'Grady Show, while O'Grady was away.

In 2013, Willis co-presented the ITV game show Prize Island with Alexander Armstrong. In 2015, Willis was a team captain on the six-part ITV2 comedy panel show Reality Bites, hosted by Stephen Mulhern. On 2 July 2015, it was announced that Willis would present a new three-part series for ITV called What Would Be Your Miracle, about modern miracles. The series began on 28 April 2016. In January 2017, The Voice UK moved from BBC One to ITV. It was confirmed on 9 June 2016 that Willis would present the series after co-hosting three previous series on the BBC. She also presented two series of The Voice Kids on ITV since 2017. In 2017, she presented The BRITs Are Coming live on ITV. She co-presented the 2017 BRIT Awards in February alongside Dermot O'Leary. She hosted The BRITs Are Coming for a second year in 2018. She presented Your Song in 2017, a one-off special for ITV.

On 3 March 2018, Willis made a surprise appearance on Ant & Dec's Saturday Night Takeaway, as she presented Win the Ads while the main hosts playing the game as part of the show's 100th episode.

Channel 4
In 2007, Willis guest hosted the tenth week of Big Brother's Big Mouth. In 2010, Willis began presenting a Celebrity Big Brother online spin-off show entitled Celebrity Big Brother's Big i. While presenting the online spin-off in the same series, Willis also presented another edition of Big Mouth when Davina McCall entered the Big Brother house as part of a task. She was then later announced as the new co-presenter on the final series of Big Brother's Little Brother, hosting opposite George Lamb.

In 2019, Willis replaced Alice Levine and Maya Jama as host of The Circle.

Channel 5
In 2010, it was announced that Willis would replace Melinda Messenger on the Channel 5 series Live from Studio Five, but after only two months, Willis announced she would be departing in order to co-present Big Brother's Little Brother and was therefore replaced by Jayne Middlemiss.

In 2011, it was confirmed that she would be returning to the revived series, presenting the spin-off show Big Brother's Bit on the Side.

On 13 March 2013, it was reported that Brian Dowling would be axed from Big Brother and be replaced by Willis with a source saying, 'Brian has been a great host but Emma is seen by channel chiefs as a true successor to Davina. They're talking to her now about taking over the role from the summer.' It was later confirmed, on 2 April 2013 by Channel 5 that Willis would be replacing Dowling as the new host of Big Brother. On 13 June 2013, she began presenting the fourteenth series of Big Brother.

Even though Willis presents the main Big Brother and celebrity series, she still continued to host the spin-off show Bit on the Side, sharing the presenting duties with Rylan Clark. On 2 February 2015, it was announced that Willis was to present her final edition of Bit on the Side that night, and Clark would take over as the main presenter of the spin off show. 

Willis infamously interrogated Winston McKenzie during his exit interview on Celebrity Big Brother over his controversial opinions. Willis has expressed personal pride on this moment in her career. 

On 30 March 2014, Willis presented the Mum of the Year Awards, with the highlights being shown on Channel 5 that same evening.

BBC
In 2013, Willis was confirmed as the replacement for Holly Willoughby on the BBC One talent show  The Voice UK. On 11 January 2014, she began co-presenting the third series with JLS singer Marvin Humes, who replaced Reggie Yates.

In March 2014, it was announced that The Voice UK had been renewed for two future series. Both Willis and Humes returned to the show for the fourth series in 2015 and fifth series in 2016. The show was axed by the BBC after series 5 and moved to ITV in 2017.

Willis, and Reggie Yates co-hosted the Saturday night game show Prized Apart on BBC One. The series began on 13 June 2015 and was axed after the first series, due to poor ratings.

Willis is also a guest presenter on the One show from time to time

Radio
On 5 August 2012, Willis began co-presenting Sunday Morning Breakfast with Stephen Mulhern across the Heart network.

Other work
In 2015, she became the celebrity ambassador for Gillette Venus and Oral-B.

Awards
In September 2013, Willis received a longlist nomination for Most Popular Entertainment Presenter at the National Television Awards in 2014. It was her second successive longlist nomination for the award.

Personal life
On 5 July 2008, Emma Griffiths married Busted member Matt Willis at Rushton Hall, Northamptonshire, after three years of dating. The wedding was featured in OK magazine. She gave birth to their first child, Isabelle, in June 2009. In November 2011, the couple had a second child, Ace, and in May 2016, Willis gave birth to her third child, Trixie.

In an episode of Who Do You Think You Are?, Willis confirmed that she has longstanding roots in Birmingham, with her family tree being traced back to her great-great-great-grandfather, who was named James Gretton and was listed as a Horn and Hair Merchant in the census records. She also found she had Irish ancestors, a fact that came as a surprise to her. The revelations about her ancestry left her extremely uncomfortable with the actions of one, who she discovered was a violent Orangeman, but overall she was happy to have found a connection to her more broad Irish heritage.

Willis is a supporter of Aston Villa F.C.

In 2019, Willis obtained a qualification as a maternity care assistant following her experience on the W series Delivering Babies.

During the COVID-19 pandemic in 2021, Willis and her husband completed training with St John Ambulance to act as vaccination volunteers.

Filmography

References

External links

1976 births
Living people
English television presenters
Heart (radio network)
Matt Willis
People from Birmingham, West Midlands
Comic Relief people